Natalie Pike (born 4 April 1983 in Edinburgh, Scotland, raised in Berwick-on-Tweed and Stockport in England) is a British model and broadcaster, currently working as a presenter for Manchester City FC and BBC Radio Manchester.

Early life 
Pike attended Ladybrook Primary School until the age of 11, then went to Bramhall High School until the age of 16, and sat her A-levels at Aquinas Sixth Form College, in maths, communication studies and performing arts. Pike completed a degree in film and media studies at Manchester Met University in 2004.

Career

Modelling

Natalie won the (FHM magazine High Street Honeys modelling competition in 2004. She appeared on the front cover of FHM again in 2005 and 2007.

Pike also appeared on the cover of Zoo and Nuts magazines several times. She featured in FHM's list of the 100 Sexiest Women in 2005 (#26) and 2006 (#51).

She was a hostess on the ITV1 game show The Price Is Right, presented by Joe Pasquale.

In 2006, Pike released a single with the other FHM High Street Honeys called I Touch Myself.

In the April 2007, UK edition of FHM, it was announced that readers of the magazine had voted Pike as their favourite ever Honey, and that she would go on to the Xbox 360 Global Challenge. As part of the challenge she flew to and from Japan, Australia, the United States, and Mexico within 360 hours. In each country, she and four other European Honeys competed in missions based on Xbox 360 games. Pike and the UK team won the overall competition.

Pike appeared on the first season of the UK version of Beauty and the Geek, which aired on Channel 4 and E4. She was partnered with Mathematics student Jamie Sawyer, and they were eliminated after three episodes.

Broadcasting

Pike is an avid Manchester City supporter, and modelled the new kit in 2006. Since 2011, she has worked as a presenter for the club's in-house media team, including City Square Live, the Manchester City match day programme, interviewing players and celebrities, as well as providing analysis on games. She also presents Match Day Live at Manchester City with guests including former players, pundits and fans.

Pike began her radio career at local radio station XS Manchester, presenting a weekly football talk show on Friday nights, and later, providing maternity cover for the station's breakfast show.

On 29 May 2021, Pike became the first female winner of the ‘Champion of Champions’ edition of BBC Radio 5 Live's sports show Fighting Talk. 

In August 2021, Pike became the new co-presenter of  Talking Balls, which she presents with Gaz Drinkwater on BBC Radio Manchester three nights a week.  She is also a relief presenter for BBC Radio 5 Live's football phone-in show, 606.

Pike is a director of the Stockport-based homeless charity, The Wellspring.

Personal life
On 26 December 2013, Pike escaped serious injury as her car spun off the A1 on black ice as she was driving from Scotland to Manchester, and was taken to hospital in Newcastle-upon-Tyne. She has a son named Reggie born on 1 October 2017.

References

External links 
 

1983 births
Alumni of Manchester Metropolitan University
Glamour models
Living people
Television personalities from Edinburgh
People from Berwick-upon-Tweed
People from Stockport
Scottish female models
Anglo-Scots